Samurai Shodown: Warriors Rage, known as  in Japan, is the seventh game in SNK's Samurai Shodown series of fighting games, and the third 3D game. It was designed for the original Sony PlayStation console.

Gameplay
The first change to the earlier games was the improved character roster, which featured all new playable characters with two exceptions: Haohmaru and Hanzo Hattori, though Hattori is not actually the same man as in the earlier versions of the game. In previous versions, Hattori was Hanzo's son Shinzo, who assumed his name. Nicotine, Gaira, Nakoruru and Rimururu – characters from the previous game – not only play a role in the story, but also are presented as playable options.

Though the game still featured 3D, SNK sought to further diminish the role of the third dimension, with no movement along the Z-axis beyond a basic dodge. Two buttons control weak and strong slashes, a third controls kick attack, and the fourth is used for dodges.

The game introduces a new life bar system, which is subdivided into three sections. The first "round" of the fight lasts until one person was drained of all three sections, upon which one section of the bar would disappear and the remaining two would refill. Once those two were drained, the second section would be dropped, with the last one refilled. This was punctuated by a pause in the action, during which the other player would go through a taunt animation. The match was finally over when one player had been drained of this last section of life.

Plot

Taking place 20 years after the events of the original games, Samurai Shodown: Warriors Rage has the player take the role of a warrior for hire who must stop an evil gang and rescue Rimururu.

Characters
Returning characters:
Haohmaru
Hanzo Hattori
Nakoruru (as a non-playable Koro-pok-guru)
Rimururu (non-playable)

New characters:
Seishiro Kuki – protagonist who has been ordered by the government to stop his brother, Tohma. Wields a blue katana.
Jin-Emon Hanafusa – partner to Seishiro who has also been sent by the government to capture Jushiro. Wields a jumonji-yari.
Jushiro Sakaki – the leader of the anti-government group "Atom Rebels". Wields a katana with a gun concealed in its hilt.
Rinka Yoshino –  a member of the "Atom Rebels" who wants to restore her family name. Wields a nodachi.
Saya – the final member of the "Atom Rebels" who wants to avenge the death of her family. Wields a pair of sickles.
Haito Kanakura – a freelance bodyguard from Ritenkyo who fights in order to gain his freedom. Wields an unsheathed swordstick in reverse grip.
Yaci Izanagi – a man from Ritenkyo who fights to rescue his lover, Namino. Wields a saw blade.
Garyo the Whirlwind – a bandit leader who wants revenge for his comrades and also wants the hand of Mikoto in marriage. Wields a short sword that remains concealed in its sheath to use as a club.
Ran Po – a young orphan who is searching for his younger sister, Minto. Wields a giant hammer.
Mikoto – the daughter of Asura who sides with Oboro. She fights because she wants to be her own woman. Wields a nagayari.
Tohma Kuki – adopted brother to Seishiro who wants his brother's sword for more power. Wields an orange katana.
Oboro – the final boss of the game. He is the leader of the "Three Blades of Domination". Wields either a blue sword or a red spear by magic.
Tashon Mao – a Chinese warrior who "protects" Nakoruru from strangers. Wields a giant gauntlet with a talon.
Daruma – a wandering veteran swordsman who wants to stop Oboro. Wields a cane with a sword concealed in it.
Minto – a young girl who wants to find her friend, Mario. Wields a hammer shaped like a cat's paw.
Mugenji – a serial murderer who wants to be reborn as a butterfly. Wields a spiked nata.
Yuda – a fusion product of both Asuras who appeared in Samurai Shodown 64: Warriors Rage. Wields a red katana.
Samurai – a common swordsman who longs to return to his home. Wields a suyari.
Iga ninjas – loyal warriors under the command of Hanzo. Wield a ninjato.
Oboro's amazons – servant maidens who fight for Oboro. Wield a pair of ninja swords.
Brute – a rebellious grunt who only cares for money. Wields a katana called a dosu.

Release

SNK gave the game an extremely similar English title to that of its predecessor, Samurai Shodown 64: Warriors Rage. This generated considerable confusion, and led many to the assumption that it was a port of the second Hyper Neo Geo 64 game. It was also released in relatively limited numbers outside Japan, as the gaming market was gearing up for the release of the PlayStation 2. This meant that few people had actually seen either game, therefore the title was the factor they were aware of.  Even a cursory comparison between the two games reveals that they are two very different entities. To help eliminate confusion, Samurai Shodown: Warriors Rage is now frequently referred to in English-speaking circles as Warriors Rage 2, or SSWR2 for short.

Reception

The game received mixed to negative reception.

External links
Official websites in English and Japanese

References

1999 video games
Fighting games
3D fighting games
PlayStation (console) games
PlayStation Network games
Samurai Shodown video games
SNK games
Video games about samurai
Video game sequels
Video games developed in Japan